Yaqob II (b.699) was Patriarch of the Church of the East from 753 to 773.  He is included in the traditional list of patriarchs of the Church of the East.  He spent much of his reign in prison after offending the caliph al-Mansur.

Sources 
Brief accounts of Yaqob's reign are given in the Ecclesiastical Chronicle of the Jacobite writer Bar Hebraeus (floruit 1280) and in the ecclesiastical histories of the Nestorian writers Mari (twelfth-century), Amr (fourteenth-century) and Sliba (fourteenth-century).

Yaqob's patriarchate 
The following account of Yaqob's reign is given by Bar Hebraeus, who was particularly interested in the agreement made between the Nestorian and Jacobite churches under which the Nestorians built a church in the Jacobite stronghold of Tagrit in return for the restoration of the Jacobite church of Mar Domitius in Nisibis.

Then Yaqob was installed and consecrated at Seleucia, after the bishops received a written pledge from him that he would neither break the law nor violate the canons.  In his time a church was built in Tagrit for the Nestorians on the initiative of Sliba-zkha, bishop of Tirhan.  He had been imprisoned in chains along with the catholicus Yaqob, and when he regained his freedom began to build his churches in Tirhan, and even went to Tagrit to visit the maphrian Paul, whom he tried to persuade to allow the Nestorians to build a church in Tagrit.  The maphrian replied, 'I myself have no objection, but I am afraid of the patriarch and the people of Tagrit.  I therefore advise you to go to Nisibis and persuade the Nestorians to restore to the Jacobites the churches they have taken from them.  Then the people of Tagrit will surely agree that a church can be built among them for your people.'   And so Sliba-zkha went to Nisibis, and petitioned the aged metropolitan Cyprian and the Nestorians of Nisibis, and they restored the celebrated church of Mar Domitius to our people.  Then ten of the Jacobite merchants who lived in Nisibis went to Tagrit and petitioned for a church to be built there for the Nestorians.  Sliba-zkha also went to the patriarch Giwargis who was still imprisoned in Baghdad, and they both wrote to the people of Tagrit, asking them to conclude the matter.  Although a number of argumentative young men objected, their elders did not follow them, but granted the Nestorians a piece of land next to the Tigris, by the outer walls of the city.  There they built a small church, in which they still hold their services to this day.  They began to build it in the year 150 of the Arabs [767/8].

See also
 List of patriarchs of the Church of the East

Notes

References
 Abbeloos, J. B., and Lamy, T. J., Bar Hebraeus, Chronicon Ecclesiasticum (3 vols, Paris, 1877)
 Assemani, J. A., De Catholicis seu Patriarchis Chaldaeorum et Nestorianorum (Rome, 1775)
 Brooks, E. W., Eliae Metropolitae Nisibeni Opus Chronologicum (Rome, 1910)
 Gismondi, H., Maris, Amri, et Salibae: De Patriarchis Nestorianorum Commentaria I: Amri et Salibae Textus (Rome, 1896)
 Gismondi, H., Maris, Amri, et Salibae: De Patriarchis Nestorianorum Commentaria II: Maris textus arabicus et versio Latina (Rome, 1899)

External links 

Patriarchs of the Church of the East
8th-century bishops of the Church of the East
Nestorians in the Abbasid Caliphate
Prisoners and detainees of the Abbasid Caliphate
8th-century people from the Abbasid Caliphate
8th-century archbishops